HMS Tickler was launched in 1794 as a Conquest-class gunbrig. She was sold in 1802.

Career
Lieutenant James Gomm commissioned Teazer in February 1795. She then joined Sir Sidney Smith's squadron. This escalated into a situation that involved counter-charges and the confinement of Hicks, Allardyce, and Gomm. Smith was dissatisfied with the officers' conduct but would later write that he had treated the officers with great leniency.

Lieutenant John Johnson recommissioned Tickler in August 1797.

Lieutenant Thomas Williams commanded Tickler from August 1797.

Between March and June 1798 Tickler was at Portsmouth undergoing coppering and conversion to a brig.

On 7 August 1799 Carolina capsized in the English Channel off Poole, Dorset. Tickler, under the command of Lieutenant Williams, rescued her crew. Carolina was on a voyage from Ystadt, Sweden to Dublin. She was later taken in to Portsmouth. 

Tickler sailed with the fleet that would attack Copenhagen in 1801. However, she does not appear in the listing of vessels whose crews qualified for the clasp "Copenhagen 1801) to the Naval General Service Medal (1847). The fleet assembled in the Kattegat in March 1801 but on 22 March a storm came up that dispersed some of the vessels. The gun-brig  was driven under the guns of Varberg Fortress where the Swedes captured her; they restored her to the British in May 1801.  had towed Tickler on 13 March and the weather caused Russell to ground; she was gotten off by the exertions of her crew.

Fate
The "Principal Officers and Commissioners and of His Majesty's Navy" offered "Tickler, Gun-Vessel, 150 Tons, Copper-bottomed, lying at Portsmouth", for sale on 12 May 1802. She sold there on that day.

Note

Citations

References
 Barrow, John (1848) The life and correspondence of Admiral Sir William Sidney Smith. (Bentley).

 Gomm, James (1801) Narrative founded on a series of events which took place in the island of St. Marcou. (London: printed by Lewis & Co.).
 

1794 ships
Gunvessels of the Royal Navy
Maritime incidents in 1799